In Traditional Chinese medicine, the Six Levels or Six Stages is a theory that originated from Shang Han Lun (translated into "On Cold Damage") by Zhang Zhongjing in 220 CE or about 1800 years ago.

The Six Stages 
The six stages are
 Tai Yang or Greater Yang
 Yang Ming or Bright Yang
 Shao Yang or Lesser Yang
 Tai Yin or Greater Yin
 Shao Yin or Lesser Yin
 Jue Yin or Terminal Yin

As can be seen the names of the levels are the same as the names of the head and foot pairs of acupuncture meridians. The order is roughly the order that a disease takes as you go from health to death. In some disease levels are skipped or the order can change.

Tai Yang stage 
(related to Urinary bladder/Small intestine channels) is started when a person is exposed to an exterior cold pathogen. The symptoms are Fever and maybe small chills, aversion to cold, pain in the back of the neck and head, Tongue has not yet changed, Pulse is floating. This stage has two sub stages.

1. Attack by wind.

2. Attack by cold.

3. Water Amassment

4. Blood amassment

Treatment in this stage to release the exterior (sweating)

Yang Ming stage
(related to the stomach and large intestine channels) has high fever, profuse sweating, aversion to heat, thirst, red face, restlessness. The tongue has a red body and dry coating. Pulse Rapid, flooding (until the fluids are injured, and it becomes deficient and rapid.  This stage is called the 4 greats (great pulse, fever, great thirst, great sweat)

Treatment-clearing, draining

Shao Yang stage
(related to the San Jiao and Gallbladder channels) channel symptoms- loss of hearing, red eyes, dizziness, visual distortion, headaches and hypochondriac pain, alternating cold and hot. bowel symptoms-bitter taste, nausea or retching, irritability, anxiety Tongue-Thin, thin coat (that could be white or yellow) pulse-wiry

Treatment-Harmonize

Tai Yin 
(related to Lung and Spleen) chronic watery diarrhea, vomiting, loss of appetite, no thirst, abdominal pain Tongue-white coating Pulse-xu (deficient pulse) unless severe pain, then xu and wiry

Treatment-warm

Shao Yin 
(related to the Heart and Kidneys) 2 subsections—constant fatigue in either situation
Hot- fever, irritability, insomnia, dry mouth and throat, scanty and dark urine.  This is a xu heat, meaning the treatment is nourishing yin and not clearing heat

Cold-frequent urination with clear urine, cold extremities, aversion to cold, perhaps body joint aches and diarrhea.  treatment method is warming.

Tongue-Red if hot pattern, pale if cold pattern
Pulse-faint and weak -rapid with heat

Jue Yin 
(related to the liver and pericardium channels)Primary symptoms-thirst, qi surging into chest with burning pain, hunger with no desire to eat, cold extremities.
heat patterns-diarrhea with burning sensation, rectal heaviness, abdominal cramps, thirst or cold extremities with interior heat
cold patterns- cold limbs, diarrhea with undigested food, vomiting, headaches on vertex, spasm
Upper heat, lower cold-severe vomiting-case relates to roundworms

References

Traditional Chinese medicine